IDEAS may stand for:

 I-DEAS (Integrated Design and Engineering Analysis Software), a computer-aided design software package
 IDEAS For Us, American environmental organization
 IDEAS Group, International Defence Enterprise Architecture Specification For Exchange group, developers of the IDEAS ontological foundation
 IDEAS UAV, a Chinese unmanned aerial vehicle
 Institute for Democracy and Economic Affairs, a Malaysian libertarian think tank
 International Defence Exhibition and Seminar, a defence sector event, held biennially, in Pakistan
 IDEAS, a database maintained by the Research Papers in Economics project

See also
 Idea (disambiguation)
 Ideas (disambiguation)